Pramod Kureel (born 12 September 1966, in Delhi) is an Indian politician from Uttar Pradesh who belonged to the Bahujan Samaj Party.

He was a member of the Rajya Sabha during 2010–2012 from Uttar Pradesh.

References

1966 births
Living people
Rajya Sabha members from Uttar Pradesh
Bahujan Samaj Party politicians from Uttar Pradesh
Delhi politicians
21st-century Indian politicians